Kasaloo Kyanga (May 20, 1957 – September 9, 2011) was a Congolese musician, guitarist, and composer. Kyanga's compositions, including the hit song "Masafa Marefu", composed with Tancut Almasi Orchestra, continue to be performed by musicians. His other hit songs include "Nimemkaribisha Nyoka", "Butinini", "Kashasha", and "Kambwembwe".


Family 
He and his twin brother, Kyanga Songa, were born on May 20, 1957.

Career 
Kyanga and Songa performed with the Tangut band. Attendees witnessed the Fimbo Lugoda and Kinyekinye Kisonzo Tisa Kumi Mangala styles. Kyanga, known for his metallic voice, arrived in Tanzania from the Democratic Republic of Congo (then Zaire) in 1980. Kyanga began working with the Orchestra Matimila Band, led by Remmy Ongala. Some of his best-known works include, "Almasi", "Bishada", "Natoa Onyo", and "Usia". Kyanga also collaborated with Congolese musician Skassy Kasambula.

Kyanga, Kasambula, and Semhando went to Tomatoma, and Kyanga composed "Mwanaidi". He later joined his brother Songa as a vocalist in Orchestra Marquis Original. Kyanga and Songa became more popular with compositions such as "Karubandika", "Sofia", "Clara", "Hasira Hasara", "Ni Wewe Pekee", and many others that won accolades globally. Kyanga and Songa later left Orchestra Marquis and worked with the Tancut Almasi Orchestra in Iringa. Additional hits including, "Masafa Marefu", "Pili Wangu", "Tutasele", "Kiwele", and "Jane Butinini" (Kyanga's wife), further increased their popularity.

Butinini, who used to be a netball star, happened to be the sister of Duncan Butini, a former member of the Railways Football team from Morogoro.

Death 
Kyanga's death was announced in the early morning of September 9, 2011. He died from a pleural effusion. Veteran musician Kikumbi Mwanza Mpango Mwema, popularly known as King Kiki, confirmed Kyanga's death.

Discography 
 Mchezo Umekwisha
 Karubandika
 Masafa Marefu

References

External links 
 Youtube
 Kasaloo Kyanga on Instagram

Tanzanian musicians
1957 births
2011 deaths
Democratic Republic of the Congo musicians
21st-century Democratic Republic of the Congo people